Delplanqueia cortella is a species of moth in the family Pyralidae. It was described by Constant in 1884. It is found in Italy and on Sardinia and Corsica.

The wingspan is 22–24 mm.

References

Moths described in 1884
Phycitini
Moths of Europe